3sat is a free-to-air German-language public service television channel. It is a generalist channel with a cultural focus and is jointly operated by public broadcasters from Germany (ZDF, ARD), Austria (ORF) and Switzerland (SRG SSR). The coordinating broadcaster is ZDF, at whose Mainz facility the broadcasting centre with studios for in-house productions is located.

History
3sat was established to broadcast cultural programmes, originally by satellite. The network was founded as a cooperative network by Germany's ZDF, Austria's ORF and Switzerland's SRG SSR (formerly SRG SSR idée suisse). 3sat began broadcasting on 1 December 1984. ZDF leads the cooperative, though decisions are reached through consensus of the cooperative's partners.

In 1990, DFF, television broadcaster of the German Democratic Republic became a cooperative member of 3sat, and a name change to 4sat was considered. Eventually it was decided to keep the original 3sat name. DFF's membership of 3sat was dissolved on 31 December 1991, as DFF itself ceased to exist, in accordance with Germany's Unification Treaty.

On 1 December 1993, ARD joined 3sat as a cooperative member. This followed ARD's creation of its own satellite channel, Eins Plus. 3sat is available on the European Astra satellites at 19.2° east, on cable television, and in Austria and Germany on digital terrestrial television.

In 2003, 3sat was available in 40 million households in Germany, Austria and Switzerland, and 85.5 million households across Europe. Since June 2003 3sat has been using a new on-air look and logo.  The logo has a red rectangle surrounding a number three.

In 2005, 3sat and n-tv were criticised for broadcasting TV shows which were funded by relief organizations such as World Vision Deutschland and Christoffel Blindenmission.

In 2008, the programs nano and Kulturzeit received a new on-air look and a new studios. At the "Eyes & Ears of Europe Awards", the design of Kulturzeit'''s studio was awarded first prize in the category  "Best Study Design" at Medientage München in 2008.

In 2009 3sat had a market share of 1.1% in Germany, 1.9% in Austria and 1.2% in Switzerland.

As a result of ZDF's spending for the then-new ZDFkultur, 2011 saw the end of many long-term 3sat broadcasts such as 3satbörse, Foyer, the computer and internet magazine neues, the animal show Arche Noah, the legal magazine Recht brisant, Vivo and others.

On 1 April 2017, the Direktion Europäische Satellitenprogramme'', which was responsible for 3sat and Arte programs, was dissolved. It was replaced by joint editorial teams with the other ZDF channels.

Logos

References

External links
 

ARD (broadcaster)
ZDF
Television networks in Germany
Television stations in Germany
Television networks in Switzerland
Television stations in Switzerland
Television stations in Austria
Television channels and stations established in 1984
German-language television stations
International broadcasters
ORF (broadcaster)
Mass media in Mainz
Classical music television channels
Music organisations based in Germany